Tagalag may refer to:
 Tagalag people, an ethnic group of Australia
 Tagalag language, an Australian language
 Tagalag, Valenzuela, a barangay in the city of Valenzuela, Philippines

See also 
 Tagalog (disambiguation)
 Tagalak Island

Language and nationality disambiguation pages